The Matangeshvara temple (IAST: Matangeśvara Mandir) is a Shiva temple in the Khajuraho town of Madhya Pradesh, India. It is located among the Western group of temples. Among the Chandela-era monuments of Khajuraho, it is the only Hindu temple that is still actively used for worship.

History 

The Archaeological Survey of India (ASI) assigns the Matangeshvara temple to 900-925 CE, because it has a plain design unlike the later temples of Khajuraho. However, scholar Rana P. B. Singh assigned it to approximately 1000 CE.

The temple has been classified as a Monument of National Importance by the ASI.

According to the history, a sage named Matanga manifested in form of a lingam, and controlled the god of love. His hermitages were located at Khajuraho, Kedarnath, Varanasi and Gaya. These are now the sites of four Matangeshvara ("Lord of Matanga") temples. Another account states that the temple is named after an aspect of Shiva who controlled the god of love.

Art and architecture 

The Matangeshvara temple is a larger-scale version of the Brahma temple in terms of plan and design. It has a square plan. It houses a 2.5 m high lingam, which is 1.1 m in diameter. The base platform of the lingam is 1.2 m high and 7.6 m in diameter. The lingam has Nagari and Persian inscriptions.

The Matangesvara temple is the plainest looking among the sandstone temples of Khajuraho. It is not richly decorated: its interior walls, exterior walls and curvilinear tower are devoid of carvings. The ceiling features elementary floral cusps.

Present use 

Among the Hindu temples of Khajuraho, the Matangeshvara temple is the only widely active site of worship. Around Shivaratri in February or March, a three-day ceremony is organized here to celebrate Shiva's marriage. It is attended by around 25,000 people. The lingam is bathed, dressed and decorated like a human bridegroom during the ceremony.

References

Bibliography 

 
 
 
 

Hindu temples in Khajuraho
Shiva temples in Madhya Pradesh
11th-century Hindu temples
Sandstone buildings in India